Clay Township may refer to:

Arkansas
 Clay Township, Bradley County, Arkansas, in Bradley County, Arkansas
 Clay Township, Howard County, Arkansas, in Howard County, Arkansas
 Clay Township, White County, Arkansas, in White County, Arkansas

Indiana
 Clay Township, Bartholomew County, Indiana
 Clay Township, Carroll County, Indiana
 Clay Township, Cass County, Indiana
 Clay Township, Dearborn County, Indiana
 Clay Township, Decatur County, Indiana
 Clay Township, Hamilton County, Indiana
 Clay Township, Hendricks County, Indiana
 Clay Township, Howard County, Indiana
 Clay Township, Kosciusko County, Indiana
 Clay Township, LaGrange County, Indiana
 Clay Township, Miami County, Indiana
 Clay Township, Morgan County, Indiana
 Clay Township, Owen County, Indiana
 Clay Township, Pike County, Indiana
 Clay Township, St. Joseph County, Indiana
 Clay Township, Spencer County, Indiana
 Clay Township, Wayne County, Indiana

Iowa
 Clay Township, Clay County, Iowa
 Clay Township, Grundy County, Iowa
 Clay Township, Hardin County, Iowa
 Clay Township, Harrison County, Iowa
 Clay Township, Jones County, Iowa
 Clay Township, Marion County, Iowa, in Marion County, Iowa
 Clay Township, Polk County, Iowa
 Clay Township, Shelby County, Iowa, in Shelby County, Iowa
 Clay Township, Washington County, Iowa
 Clay Township, Wayne County, Iowa
 Clay Township, Webster County, Iowa

Kansas
 Clay Township, Butler County, Kansas
 Clay Township, Reno County, Kansas, in Reno County, Kansas

Michigan
 Clay Township, Michigan

Minnesota
 Clay Township, Minnesota

Missouri
 Clay Township, Adair County, Missouri
 Clay Township, Andrew County, Missouri
 Clay Township, Atchison County, Missouri
 Clay Township, Clark County, Missouri
 Clay Township, Douglas County, Missouri, in Douglas County, Missouri
 Clay Township, Dunklin County, Missouri
 Clay Township, Gasconade County, Missouri
 Clay Township, Greene County, Missouri, in Greene County, Missouri
 Clay Township, Harrison County, Missouri
 Clay Township, Holt County, Missouri
 Clay Township, Lafayette County, Missouri
 Clay Township, Linn County, Missouri
 Clay Township, Monroe County, Missouri
 Clay Township, Ralls County, Missouri
 Clay Township, Saline County, Missouri
 Clay Township, Shelby County, Missouri
 Clay Township, Sullivan County, Missouri

North Carolina
 Clay Township, Guilford County, North Carolina, in Guilford County, North Carolina

North Dakota
 Clay Township, Renville County, North Dakota, in Renville County, North Dakota

Ohio
 Clay Township, Auglaize County, Ohio
 Clay Township, Gallia County, Ohio
 Clay Township, Highland County, Ohio
 Clay Township, Knox County, Ohio
 Clay Township, Montgomery County, Ohio
 Clay Township, Muskingum County, Ohio
 Clay Township, Ottawa County, Ohio
 Clay Township, Scioto County, Ohio
 Clay Township, Tuscarawas County, Ohio

Pennsylvania
 Clay Township, Butler County, Pennsylvania
 Clay Township, Huntingdon County, Pennsylvania
 Clay Township, Lancaster County, Pennsylvania

Township name disambiguation pages